

Lydlinch is a village and civil parish in the Blackmore Vale in north Dorset, England, about  west of Sturminster Newton. The village is sited on Oxford clay close to the small River Lydden. The parish – which includes the village of King's Stag to the south and the hamlet of Stock Gaylard to the west – is bounded by the Lydden to the east and its tributary, the Caundle Brook, to the north.

The 2011 census recorded the parish as having 199 dwellings, 192 households and a population of 437.

At King's Stag is the King's Stag Memorial Chapel which was built in 1914 at the expense of the Right Rev. Huyshe Yeatman-Biggs, the Bishop of Worcester, in memory of his wife, Lady Barbara Yeatman-Biggs, who died in 1909.

Parish church
The Church of England parish church of St Thomas Becket has a 12th-century baptismal font, but the rest of the building is Perpendicular Gothic. The nave, chancel and west tower are 15th century. The north aisle and south porch were added in the 16th century. In the 19th century the north aisle was rebuilt and the north vestry added and the building was twice restored, the second time in 1875. The church is a Grade II* listed building.

The tower has a ring of five bells. The 19th-century Dorset dialect poet William Barnes (1801–86), who was born just outside the parish in nearby Bagber, wrote of them "Vor Lydlinch bells be good vor sound, And liked by all the neighbours round". Thomas Purdue of Closworth, Somerset cast the second, fourth and tenor bells in 1681. Mears & Stainbank of the Whitechapel Bell Foundry recast the treble and third bells in 1908.

The parish is part of the Benefice of Sturminster Newton, Hinton St Mary and Lydlinch.

References

Notes

General references

External links

Civil parishes in Dorset
Villages in Dorset